The 2016 Asian Women's Club League Handball Championship, was the first edition of the Asian Women's Club League Handball Championship held from 26 October to 1 November 2016 at Kyzylorda, Kazakhstan under the aegis of Asian Handball Federation. It is the official competition for women's handball clubs of Asia crowning the Asian champions.

Participating Teams
  Ile Club
  Uzbechka Club
  Almaty Club
  Kaysar Club
  Qatar
  Shahrdari Sanandaj Club

Round-Robin

Match results

Final standings

References

External links
 www.asianhandball.org

Handball competitions in Asia
Asian Handball Championships
Asian Women's Club League Handball Championship, 2016
Asia
International handball competitions hosted by Kazakhstan